Kailash Nath (popularly known as K. Nath) (born 3 October 1945) is an Indian Dalit writer and dramatist. He is known for his autobiography, Tiraskar (1999).

References

Living people
1945 births
Dalit writers
Dramatists and playwrights from Uttar Pradesh
People from Kanpur Dehat district
Hindi-language writers
Indian autobiographers